Stenodactylus stenurus is a species of lizard in the family Gekkonidae. The species is found in Northern Africa.

References

Stenodactylus
Reptiles described in 1899